Peter Ludwig Gülke (born 29 April 1934) is a German conductor and musicologist.

Biography 
Born in Weimar, Gülke studied cello and musicology at the Hochschule für Musik Franz Liszt, Weimar. He completed his doctorate in philosophy in Leipzig in 1958, followed in 1985 by his professorial thesis at the Technical University of Berlin. In 1976 he became conductor at the Sächsische Staatsoper Dresden and in 1981 he was appointed Principal Conductor in Weimar. From 1986 to 1996 he was Principal Conductor in the City of Wuppertal. From 1996 to 2001 he was a professor of conducting at the Hochschule für Musik Freiburg and from 1999 to 2002 professor of musicology at the University of Basel. From 2011 to 2014 he was President of the Sächsische Akademie der Künste. Gülke was the chief conductor of the Brandenburger Symphoniker from 2015 to 2020.

Awards 
 1994 Sigmund Freud Prize of the Akademie für Sprache und Dichtung
 1998 Karl-Vossler-Preis
 2004 Honorary doctorate University of Bern
 2007 Honorary doctorate Hochschule für Musik Carl Maria von Weber in Dresden
 2009 Honorary doctorate Hochschule für Musik Franz Liszt, Weimar
 2014 Ernst von Siemens Music Prize
 2016 Bavarian Maximilian Order for Science and Art
 2017 Bundesverdienstkreuz am Bande

Publications 
 Das Schriftbild der mehrstimmigen Musik. Leipzig 1972.
 Musik des Mittelalters und der Renaissance. Leipzig 1973.
 Mönche, Bürger, Minnesänger. Musik in der Gesellschaft des europäischen Mittelalters. Leipzig 1975.
 Rousseau und die Musik. Wilhelmshaven 1984.
 Brahms, Bruckner. Zwei Studien. Kassel und Basel 1989.
 Schubert und seine Zeit. Laaber 1991.
 Fluchtpunkt Musik. Reflexionen eines Dirigenten zwischen Ost und West. Stuttgart and Weimar 1994.
 Triumph der neuen Tonkunst. Mozarts letzte Sinfonien und ihr Umfeld. Stuttgart and Weimar 1998; 
 „… immer das Ganze vor Augen“. Studien zu Beethoven. Stuttgart 2000.
 Die Sprache der Musik. Essays zur Musik von Bach bis Holliger. Stuttgart and Kassel 2001.  or 
 Guillaume Du Fay. Die Musik des 15. Jahrhunderts. Stuttgart 2003, 
 Auftakte-Nachspiele. Kassel, Stuttgart and Weimar 2006.
 Robert Schumann. Glück und Elend der Romantik, Zsolnay Verlag, Munich 2010 
 Gegen den Strom und mit der Zeit. Sächsische Akad. der Künste, Dresden 2011, 
 Von Bach bis Beethoven. Kassel 2014.
 Musik und Abschied. Kassel, Stuttgart and Weimar 2015.
 Felix Mendelssohn Bartholdy. Stuttgart 2017, 
 Dirigenten. Hildesheim 2017,

References

External links 
 
 
 Deutschlandfunk (DLF) Kulturfragen. Debatten und Dokumente vom 18. Mai 2014: Dirigent Peter Gülke. Bekennender Grenzgänger, interview with Uwe Friedrich

German conductors (music)
20th-century German musicologists
Academic staff of the Hochschule für Musik Freiburg
Recipients of the Cross of the Order of Merit of the Federal Republic of Germany
Recipients of the Austrian Cross of Honour for Science and Art, 1st class
Schubert scholars
Ernst von Siemens Music Prize winners
1934 births
Living people
Musicians from Weimar
Du Fay scholars